Mexicana Universal Tlaxcala is a pageant in Tlaxcala, Mexico, that selects that state's representative for the national Mexicana Universal pageant.

In 2004, 2005, 2006, 2007, 2008, 2010 and 2011 was not sent to a State Representative.

The State Organization hasn't had a national winner in Nuestra Belleza México.

Titleholders
Below are the names of the annual titleholders of Nuestra Belleza Tlaxcala 1994-2016, Mexicana Universal Tlaxcala 2017, and their final placements in the Mexicana Universal.

 Competed in Miss Universe.
 Competed in Miss International.
 Competed in Miss Charm International.
 Competed in Miss Continente Americano.
 Competed in Reina Hispanoamericana.
 Competed in Miss Orb International.
 Competed in Nuestra Latinoamericana Universal.

External links
Official Website

Nuestra Belleza México